The Uganda Salvation Front (alternately Uganda Salvation Army) was a terrorist organization operating in eastern Uganda.

Activities
In 1998, the USF attacked Tororo Prison and abducted several inmates. 
In 1999, David Nyekorach-Matsanga, a senior official of the Lord's Resistance Army, announced his resignation.  Matsanga stated that the LRA had become a tool of the Sudanese government, and that he would continue the fight to remove Ugandan President Yoweri Museveni with his own rebel group: the USF.

Sources
Uganda: Country Reports on Human Rights Practices - 1999 Bureau of Democracy, Human Rights and Labor, U.S. Department of State. February 2000*

References

Paramilitary organisations based in Uganda
Defunct organizations designated as terrorist in Africa